was a Japanese statesman, courtier and politician during the Nara period.

Career at court
He was a minister during the reigns of Empress Kōken/Shōtoku and Emperor Kōnin.

 770 (Jingo-keiun 4, 8th month): When Empress Shōtoku died without having named an heir, Momokawa was influential in the process which led to the enthronement of Emperor Kōnin.
 773 (Hōki 4): Sangi Momokawa was chief advocate for Daigaku-no-kami Yamabe-shinnō, who was named Crown Prince and heir of Kōnin.
 August 28, 779 (Hōki 10, 7th month): Momkawa died at age 48.

The posthumous influence of Momokawa was ensured when Emperor Kanmu followed Emperor Kōnin on the Chrysanthemum Throne.

Genealogy
Momokawa's father was Fujiwara no Umakai; and his mother was Kume no Wakame. He was one of eight brothers (including Fujiwara no Hirotsugu).

Momokawa married Fujiwara no Moroane, daughter of Fujiwara no Yoshitsugu, a noble during the Nara period. His children included two sons: Fujiwara no Otsugu (774–843), Fujiwara no Tsugunari (779–842). His daughters were Fujiwara no Tabiko (759–788), and Fujiwara no Tarashiko (d. 794).

Tabiko became the consort of Emperor Kammu with whom she bore Prince Ōtomo, who became Emperor Junna). During Emperor Junna's reign, she was the Empress Dowager.

Tarashiko was the wife of Emperor Heizei. She died in 794 during the moving of the imperial capital to Heian-kyō. In 806, she received the posthumous title of kōgō when Emperor Heizei was enthroned.

Father: Fujiwara no Umakai
Mother: Kume no Wakame
Wife: Fujiwara no Moroane, daughter of Fujiwara no Yoshitsugwere 
Eldest Daughter: Fujiwara no Tabiko (759–788)
Second Daughter: Fujiwara no Tarashiko (d. 794).
Concubine: Daughter of Ise Otsu
Eldest Son: Fujiwara no Otsugu (774–843)
Third Son: Fujiwara no Tsugio (779—842)
Concubine: Unknown name
Second Son: Fujiwara no Tsugunari (779–842)

Notes

References
 Kanō, Shigefumi.
 Kimoto, Yoshinobu.
 Nussbaum, Louis-Frédéric and Käthe Roth. (2005).  Japan encyclopedia. Cambridge: Harvard University Press. ;  OCLC 58053128
 Ponsonby-Fane, Richard Arthur Brabazon. (1959).  The Imperial House of Japan. Kyoto: Ponsonby Memorial Society. OCLC 194887
 Titsingh, Isaac. (1834).  Annales des empereurs du Japon (Nihon Ōdai Ichiran).  Paris: Royal Asiatic Society, Oriental Translation Fund of Great Britain and Ireland. OCLC 5850691 

732 births
779 deaths
Fujiwara clan
People of Nara-period Japan